Philip Ernest Summerill (born 20 November 1947) is an English former professional footballer who played as a striker in the Football League for Birmingham City, Huddersfield Town, Millwall and Wimbledon.

Summerill was born in Erdington, Birmingham. He spent the major part of his professional career at Birmingham City, whom he joined from school. He was their leading scorer for three successive seasons from 1968–69 to 1970–71, and contributed to their promotion to the Football League First Division in 1972. He went on to play League football for Huddersfield Town, Millwall and Wimbledon, and for several more years in non-League football. He later worked for Birmingham City Council in football development and coaching.

Honours
with Birmingham City
Second Division promotion 1972
with Wimbledon
Fourth Division promotion 1979

References

1947 births
Living people
Footballers from Birmingham, West Midlands
English footballers
Association football forwards
Birmingham City F.C. players
Huddersfield Town A.F.C. players
Millwall F.C. players
Wimbledon F.C. players
English Football League players